Mike Oliver may refer to:

 Mike Oliver (disability advocate) (1945–2019), British academic and disability advocate
 Mike Oliver (field hockey) (born 1973), field hockey player from Canada

See also
 Michael Oliver (disambiguation)